The Dan oil field is a large oil and associated gas field in the Danish sector of the North Sea, about  west of Esbjerg.

The field 
The Dan field was discovered in May 1971 by the Britannia oil rig in Denmark Block 7.3 of the North Sea. The reservoir is an Upper Cretaceous Danian chalk at a depth of 5,800 to 6,400 feet (1,768 to 1,951 metres). The oil has an API gravity of 30.4 and a gas oil ratio of 600 standard cubic feet per barrel (scf/bbl). The estimated recoverable reserves are 90–125 million barrels (14.3–19.9 million cubic metres) of oil and 1.2–1.3 trillion cubic feet (34–37 billion cubic metres) of gas.

Development 
The field was developed in phases through multi-platform installations, summarized as follows:

Production of condensate (in 1000s of barrels) was:

See also 
 Tyra Field
 Gorm Field

References

Maersk Oil
Natural gas fields in Denmark
North Sea oil fields
Oil fields of Denmark